The Sky's the Limit is the fourth studio album released by American country music band BlackHawk. Their final studio album for Arista Nashville, it features the singles "There You Have It" and "Your Own Little Corner of My Heart", which respectively reached #4 and #27 on the Hot Country Songs charts. "There You Have It" was also a number 41 on the Billboard Hot 100. It was also the last album to feature member Van Stephenson, who left the band in 2000 to focus on his battle with melanoma until his death from the disease in 2001.

Track listing

Chart performance

Album

Singles

Personnel

BlackHawk 
Henry Paul – lead vocals, acoustic guitar, mandolin
Dave Robbins – baritone vocals, keyboards, piano
Van Stephenson – tenor vocals, electric guitar

Additional musicians 
Tim Akers – synthesizer strings, accordion
Aubrey Haynie – fiddle
Dann Huff – electric guitar
Greg Jennings – acoustic guitar, electric guitar
Brent Mason – electric guitar
Terry McMillan – percussion, harmonica
Eric Silver – mandolin
Lonnie Wilson – drums
Glenn Worf – bass guitar

Guest musicians 
Dave Turnbull – background vocals on "Your Own Little Corner of My Heart"
"Monkey Boy", Chris Rowe, Ema Jean Bean, Bobbi Bean, Jenny Johnson – hand claps on "When I Find It, I'll Know It"

References 

1998 albums
Arista Records albums
Blackhawk (band) albums
Albums produced by Mark Bright (record producer)